Slasher: an IFC Original is a 2004 documentary directed by John Landis, produced by Chris Kobin, Stephen Cantor, and Daniel Laikind.  The film chronicles the exploits of Michael Bennet, one of America's top used car salesmen, as he travels to Memphis, Tennessee to stage a slasher sale. The film is a compelling look at a conflicted man and a shady business.  It premiered at the 2004 South by Southwest Film Festival before playing on the Independent Film Channel.

External links
Slasher on IMDB
Time Magazine review

American documentary films